Harriet-Ann Omobolanle (Bola) Adesola is the Senior Vice-Chairman at Standard Chartered Bank Group where she was previously the CEO of Standard Chartered Bank for Nigeria and West Africa. Adesola has over 25 years of experience in the banking sector.

Education and career
Bola Adesola commenced her banking career with Prime Merchant Bank, where she served as Treasury Officer before moving to Citibank in 1990. While at Citibank she held several Treasury roles in, including Country Treasurer for Citibank Tanzania between 1995 and 1997. Her nine years with Citi included other senior management roles for nine (9) years in Nigeria.

In 1999, Bola was headhunted and appointed Managing Director/Chief Executive Officer of Kakawa Discount House Limited, a securities trading and asset management firm owned by a consortium of the biggest banks in Nigeria at that time.

Bola was approached to join the board of Nigeria’s premier bank, First Bank of Nigeria Plc, in 2005 and was appointed Executive Director, Corporate Banking Thereafter she became Executive Director, Lagos Directorate for the bank. She also served as director on the boards of FBN Capital Limited, and FBN Trustees Limited.

In 2011, Standard Chartered Bank Nigeria Limited appointed Bola as the first Nigerian, and first female CEO. Bola’s portfolio for Standard Chartered Bank was expanded in 2015 to include the Group’s business in West Africa. She also served on the boards of Standard Chartered Bank in Ghana, Cameroun, Cote D’Ivoire, respectively, and Bola was Chairman of Standard Chartered Bank, Mauritius.

After 8 years of firmly embedding sustainable profitability for the bank, and championing the growth and development of African talent for the bank, Bola was appointed Senior vice-Chairman, Africa for Standard Chartered Bank. In May 2021, Mrs Adesola retired from Standard Chartered Bank after 10 years of impactful service.

In July 2021, Mrs Adesola was appointed to the board of Ecobank Nigeria Limited as Chairman. She has also been Chairman, Lagos State Employment Trust Fund (LSETF) since July 2020. As board member of Imperial Logistics Plc, a shipper listed on the Johannesburg Stock Exchange, Bola also serves on the Board Social, Ethics & Sustainability Committee.

She is an alumnus of Harvard Business School and Lagos Business School, where she is the immediate past-President of the Alumni Association. Bola holds a Law degree from the University of Buckingham, UK and is an Associate of the Chartered Institute of Arbitrators, U.K. and Nigeria.

She is an Honorary Fellow and former Council Member of the Chartered Institute of Bankers Nigeria, a founding Trustee of Financial Markets Dealers Association, and has served on the boards of Nigeria Interbank Settlement Systems Plc and the Financial Institutions Training Centre. Bola is also past Chair of the Bankers’ Committee sub-Committee on Economic Development, Sustainability and Gender (Nigeria).  She is also a member of the Institute of Directors and of Women Corporate Directors.

Bola’s keen interest in FinTech led to her appointment on the Board of Trustees of the FinTech Association of Nigeria. 
In 2001, Bola co-founded Women in Management, Business and Public service (WIMBIZ) and she currently serves on the WIMBIZ Board of Trustees.

In 2015 she was appointed to the United Nations Global Compact (UNGC) Board by the UN Secretary General, Ban Ki Moon and as Co Vice-Chair of the Board in February 2018. 
Bola is married and is the proud mother of twin girls. She is an avid reader, extensively travelled, and an art enthusiast.

Honors and activities

Financial  Markets Dealers Association  - Trustee and Executive Board Member 
Central Bank  of Nigeria Bankers’ Committee on Economic Development, Sustainability and Gender - Chairperson 
United Nations Global Compact – Member, 2018 
United Nations - Director, 2015 
Nigeria National Competitiveness Council  - Executive Member, 2013 
Lagos  Business School Alumni Association (LBSAA) - Vice President,
Fate Foundation - Board  Member 
Women in Business and Management (WIMBIZ) - Co-founder and Former Chairperson, 2001

References

Year of birth missing (living people)
Living people
Alumni of the University of Buckingham
Harvard Business School alumni
Nigerian accountants
Nigerian corporate directors
Women corporate directors
Nigerian women business executives
Nigerian bankers
Nigerian women lawyers